During the 1989–90 season Aldershot F.C. competed in the Football League Fourth Division.

Fourth Division Results

FA Cup

League Trophy 
Southern Section

References 

1989-90
Aldershot